The women's 10 metre platform was part of the Diving at the 2018 Commonwealth Games program. The competition was held on 12 April 2018 at Gold Coast Aquatic Centre in Gold Coast.

Format
The competition was held in two rounds:
 Preliminary round: All 12 divers perform five dives; total scores determine the starting order in final.
 Final: The 12 divers perform five dives; the preliminary round scores are erased and the top three divers win the gold, silver and bronze medals accordingly.

Schedule
All times are Australian Eastern Standard Time (UTC+10).

Results
Results:

References

Diving at the 2018 Commonwealth Games
Com